The Pretenders is a lost 1916 American silent film. It was produced by B. A. Rolfe and distributed by Metro Pictures with a story by Channing Pollock. Stage actress Emmy Wehlen starred.

Cast

References

External links

1916 films
American silent feature films
Lost American films
Films directed by George D. Baker
1916 comedy-drama films
1910s English-language films
American black-and-white films
1916 lost films
Lost comedy-drama films
1910s American films
Silent American comedy-drama films